Fajr Ibrahim is a Syrian football coach and former footballer.

Club career 
Fajr started playing in the Syrian League with Al-Wahda team in 1979. He remained with the club until he retired from the playing. He won the Syrian Cup in 1993 with Al-Wahda team and won the title of best left back in 1986 season.

International career 
Fajr played several international matches with Syria for five years from 1982 until 1987.

Coaching career 
He managed the Syrian first team more than 50 matches between 2006 and 2019. He did an emergency mission and replaced the German manager Bernd Stange in the last match for the team in 2019 Asian Cup against Australia. Many pundits referred that he had the UAE visa since the middle of December, so he could be ready to replace the manager if the things went wrong.

Widely unpopular with the fans and criticized by the media, Ibrahim is often considered one of the reasons for the Syria national team's poor results after their 2019 Asian Cup exit, citing his lack of achievements, and lack of vision, as some of his weakest traits, although Syria at that time had already in problem before Fajr took charge. However, he has repeatedly and openly refused to resign and has been kept as manager by the Syrian Federation, despite losing to many lesser-ranked and weaker teams, much to the bewilderment of both fans and journalists.

However, the sentiment changed surprisingly during the 2022 FIFA World Cup qualification – AFC Second Round. Syria, under the same command of Fajr Ibrahim, surprised the whole qualifiers by topping the group with five straight victories, including two important victories against rising Philippines, and a resounding 2–1 win in the UAE against China. However, he was later replaced by Tunisian coach Nabil Maâloul.

In September 2020, Ibrahim joined newly-promoted club Al-Horgelah.

Managerial statistics

Honours

Player

Club 
Syrian Cup
 Winner 1993 with Al-Wahda
Syrian Super Cup
 Winner 1993 with Al-Wahda

Manager

Club 
Syrian Premier League:
 Winner 2011–12 with Al-Shorta

International 
Syria
Nehru Cup (2): 2007 and 2009 as a runner-up

Individual 

 1985–86 Syrian League: Best Left Back of the season

References

External links 
 

Living people
Syrian football managers
Syrian footballers
Syria national football team managers
Sportspeople from Damascus
1964 births
Al-Wahda SC (Syria) players
Expatriate football managers in Iraq
Al-Mina'a SC managers
Kelantan FA managers
Association football defenders
2019 AFC Asian Cup managers
Syrian Premier League players
Syrian expatriate football managers